The 22nd Vanier Cup was played on November 22, 1986, at Varsity Stadium in Toronto, Ontario, and decided the CIAU football champion for the 1986 season. The UBC Thunderbirds won their second championship by defeating the Western Mustangs by a score of 25-23.

References

External links
 Official website

Vanier Cup
Vanier Cup
1986 in Toronto
November 1986 sports events in Canada